Trempiyada (accent on the syllable -ya-) is Hebrew (טרמפיאדה, derived from the German trampen) for a designated place at a junction of highways or main roads in Israel from which hitchhikers, called trempists, may solicit rides. There are often many people waiting at trempiadas, and passing motorists often stop to pick them up. Trempiadas often also have bus stops at the same location.

Some scholars have pointed out the religious or spiritual connotation that hitchhiking carries in Israel. Nehemia Akiva Stern writing for the University of Pittsburgh argued that it's "almost exclusively practiced by religious Zionists, mainly youth...primarily within the West Bank" and that "in short, the practice of hitchhiking within the West Bank is a ritual of sacred travel."

Etiquette 
There is an unofficial etiquette governing trempiada use which determines priority for rides such as the obvious elderly before youth. Once inside there are certain courtesies that should be observed. 

 One should not speak unless spoken to first. 
 Secondly, one should not talk on the phone or with a friend when inside, and always say 'thank you' at the start and end of the ride.  
 There is also a shorthand sign language for communication between hitchhikers and drivers. 
 Hitchhiking is done by pointing to the ground with the hand far from the body, instead of raising a thumb. 
 Hitchhiking in Israel is occasionally done with a printed sign to designate an obscure location differing from that of all the other hitchhikers at a particular trempiyada.
 As a safety precaution the driver should be saying where he/she is going instead of the 'trempist' saying where he/she needs to get.

Incidents 
Hitchhiking in Israel has been the source of political tension and has sometimes resulted in incident. Most notably in 2014, three Israeli teenagers were abducted whilst hitchhiking and found deceased soon after. Following the event, there was increased hostilities between Jewish and Arab communities. Critics blame the event on the "cavalier" attitude of young Israelis hitchhikers. Further, some journalists have observed that some Israelis insist on hitchhiking as a demonstration of their freedom and right to travel. Despite tensions and events of violence, many insist on hitchhiking and affirm its institutional role in Israeli society.

See also
List of junctions and interchanges in Israel
List of highways in Israel
Liftershalte
Slugging
Flexible carpooling

References

Transport in Israel
Israeli culture
Hitchhiking

he:טרמפיאדה